Peter Crockaert  (c. 1465–1514), known as Peter of Brussels, was a Flemish scholastic philosopher. Initially he was a pupil of John Mair and a follower of William of Ockham. Later he joined the Dominican Order, and became a supporter of orthodox Thomism. He taught at the University of Paris, and is known for a number of commentaries, on Aristotle and Peter of Spain as well as on Aquinas.

Notes

1514 deaths
Scholastic philosophers
Flemish Dominicans
Year of birth uncertain